Sidney Armor Reeve (March 27, 1866, in Dayton, Ohio - June 12, 1941, in Nyack, NY) was an author and professor of Steam and Hydraulic Engineering at the Worcester Polytechnic Institute between 1896-1906. During his time at Worcester Polytechnic Institute, Reeve was an active member in the Pi Iota Chapter of Phi Gamma Delta fraternity. He was employed as a consulting engineer in New York City between 1908 and 1932 and held over 50 patents on inventions.

Biography 
He founded the scientific field of social energetics, which was later expanded on by Frederick Soddy in his book The Role of Money.

He was inspired by reading Henry George to investigate sociology. He came to the conclusion that the same mathematics and reasoning applied equally to entropy, energy and thermodynamics in steam boilers as well as in the social body.

Bibliography 
 The cost of competition : an effort at the understanding of familiar facts
 Energy; work, heat and transformations
 The entropy-temperature analysis of steam-engine efficiencies
 Modern economic tendencies; an economic history of America
 Reeve's Plan for economic democracy
 The thermodynamics of heat-engines

References

Sources
 Kass, Irving M. 1942 "Sidney Armor Reeve: Social Energetist," Land and Freedom, January-February
 Obituary Record of Graduates of Yale University Deceased During The Year 1940-1941

External links 

 Works by Sidney A. Reeve

Engineers from Ohio
1866 births
1941 deaths
People from Dayton, Ohio